Bethany Dillon is the self-titled debut album of contemporary Christian musician Bethany Dillon. It was released on April 20, 2004.

Track listing 
"Revolutionaries" – 4:17
"Great Big Mystery" – 3:47
"Beautiful" – 4:01
"Move Forward" – 3:47
"For My Love" – 3:13
"All I Need" – 3:15
"Aimless" – 4:34
"Lead Me On" – 3:34
"Exodus (Faithful)" – 3:31
"Why" – 4:33
"A Voice Calling Out" – 5:16

Awards

On 2005, the album was nominated for a Dove Award for Pop/Contemporary Album of the Year at the 36th GMA Dove Awards.

References

2004 debut albums
Bethany Dillon albums
Sparrow Records albums